Alley cat may refer to:

Cat designations
Stray cat, a homeless domestic cat 
Feral cat, a cat that has been born to other ferals or from stray cats, and that are unaccustomed to human interaction
Domestic short-haired cat or "moggie" cat more generally, as distinct from a pedigreed cat

Organizations
Alley Cat Rescue, an organization that rescues feral and homeless cats

Media and entertainment
Alley Cat (video game), a 1983 computer game by game designer Bill Williams
Alley Cat (film), a 1984 action film
Alley Cat (2017 film), a Japanese buddy comedy film directed by Hideo Sakaki

Music
The Yale Alley Cats, an all-male a cappella singing group from Yale University founded in 1943
Alleycats (Malaysian rock band), a Malaysian musical group
The Alley Cats (1960s group), a Los Angeles doo-wop group
The Alley Cats (punk rock band), a Los Angeles punk rock band
Alley Cat (album), the debut album by Danish pianist Bent Fabric
"Alley Cat" (song), a song by Bent Fabric that won the Grammy Award for Best Rock & Roll Recording, 1962

Other
Alleycat race, bicycle messenger races in live traffic with various checkpoints
Alley Cat, a sister cat food brand of Meow Mix, manufactured by Del Monte Foods
Alleycat Amber, amber ale produced by Lost Coast Brewery

See also
The Alley Cats (disambiguation)